Totanés is a Spanish-language family name originating from the town of Totanés. Brought to the Philippines by a Spanish Franciscan friar named Fr. Sebastián de Totanés during the 18th century, he ran an orphanage for indios or natives, and baptized these orphans surnames after his hometown. There are different variations, including Tutanes, Otanes, Totañes, but all ultimately stemming from the same origin.

However, the fact that the Spanish town and surname is pronounced accented on the last syllable (to-ta-NES) has been totally lost in the Philippines due to decades-long use of the US keyboard layout, which is unable to type Spanish diacritics. As a result, the surname is often pronounced to-TA-nes.

References 

Spanish-language surnames